The Daou were a New York-based dance music quintet composed of Peter Daou (keyboards), Vanessa Daou (vocals), Mike Caro (guitar), Leon Dorsey (bass), and former 24-7 Spyz member Anthony Johnson (drums). Their only album Head Music was released in 1992, with its debut single "Surrender Yourself" rising to number one on the U.S. Hot Dance Club Play chart, where it remained for 11 weeks.

Creative disagreements with record label Columbia would see the Daou negotiate out of their contract and subsequently release Head Music's next two singles for the independent Tribal Records. The group disbanded before the release of a second project, and Vanessa Daou would reemerge as a solo act with 1994's Peter Daou-produced Zipless.

Discography
Head Music, album Columbia 1992
Singles
"Surrender Yourself" 
"Give Myself To You" 
"Are You Satisfied?" 
"Sympathy Bouquet"

See also
List of number-one dance hits (United States)
List of artists who reached number one on the US Dance chart

References

Electronic music groups from New York (state)
American dance music groups